Sincheon-dong may refer to 

Sincheon-dong, Seoul
Sincheon-dong, Daegu
Sincheon-dong, Siheung

See also
Sinchon-dong (disambiguation)